The Brand of Cowardice is a 1916 silent film starring Lionel Barrymore and released through Metro Pictures. It is a lost film.

Plot 
After Cyril Hamilton refuses to follow his father-in-law Colonel Gordon West's National Guard unit into action in the Mexican Border War, his fiancé Marcia West breaks up with him. He ashamedly enlists in another regiment and goes west but alienates all of his fellow soldiers with his pompous behavior. However, he finally redeems himself by rescuing Marcia from the bandit Navarete. Although they are overwhelmed by Navarete's forces after killing him, they are rescued by Colonel West's forces and marry.

Cast
Lionel Barrymore as Cyril Hamilton
Grace Valentine as Marcia West
Robert Cummings as Colonel Gordon West
Kate Blancke as Mrs. West
John Davidson as Navarete
Frank Montgomery as Idiqui
Louis Wolheim as Corporal Mallin
Tula Belle as Ran, Isiqui's daughter

Production 
The film was shot in Huntington and Tarrytown, New York. Battle scenes were shot in New Hampton using local convicts as extras.

See also
Lionel Barrymore filmography

References

External links

lantern slide to the film

1916 films
American silent feature films
Lost American films
1916 drama films
American black-and-white films
Films directed by John W. Noble
Silent American drama films
Metro Pictures films
1916 lost films
Lost drama films
Films shot in New York (state)
1910s American films